Misogynist terrorism is terrorism which is motivated by the desire to punish women. It is an extreme form of misogyny, the policing of women's compliance to patriarchal gender expectations. Misogynist terrorism uses mass indiscriminate violence in an attempt to avenge nonconformity with those expectations or to reinforce the perceived superiority of men.

Since 2018, misogynist or male supremacist ideology has been listed and tracked by counter-terrorist organizations as an emerging terrorist threat. The terms male supremacist terrorism and misogynistic extremism are also used for these acts of violence.

Misogynist terrorism often targets representatives or stand-ins for a type of person that the terrorist feels anger toward. For instance, some have been motivated by a perception of entitlement to sex with women of a type the perpetrator sees as attractive. These attacks, some arising from the incel subculture, have targeted both women and men seen as sexually successful.

Recognition 
According to the International Centre for Counter-Terrorism (ICCT) at the Hague, counter-terrorism experts were slow to recognize misogyny as an animating ideology for acts of mass violence in comparison to recognition of other ideologies. The National Consortium for the Study of Terrorism and Responses to Terrorism (START) and the Southern Poverty Law Center (SPLC) have tracked misogyny or male supremacy as a motivation for terrorism since 2018, describing it as a "rising threat".

The Australian Security Intelligence Organisation considers misogynist violence among the fastest-growing terrorism threats of 2021. A guidebook for law enforcement by the Organization for Security and Co-operation in Europe notes that strict and systematic control of gender roles is used as a recruitment tool both by ISIL/Daesh and by western misogynist extremists among the incel and men's rights movements. Both groups portray men as hyper-masculine warriors and women variously as passive caretakers, sources of sexual gratification, and  "the enemy" who must be punished.

The 1989 École Polytechnique massacre is recognized as the first documented mass killing explicitly motivated by antifeminist resentment. The shooter, who killed 14 women and injured 10, stated that his motivations were "political" and that he intended to "fight feminism."

Misogynist ideology is often not mentioned in reports of terrorist attacks even when attackers explicitly state it.

Motivations 
Misogyny is common among mass killers, even among those who kill for other reasons. The following are specifically misogynist motivations that have been given as primary reasons for indiscriminate mass killings.

Problems which men face in the modern world  
Laura Bates writes that real problems and insecurities faced by young mensuch as workplace injuries, cancer, and suicidecan be co-opted by organized online extremist groups. These groups present masculine strength, a lack of vulnerability, a lack of  emotion, and other stereotypes of masculinity as solutions to these problems although, she writes, these stereotypes actually cause or exacerbate the problems they claim to solve. Bates says that this ideological grooming can lead to calls for mass violence against women, and that when this occurs it should be categorized as terrorism.

Laurie Penny writes that, like other forms of violent extremism, misogynist extremism "promises the lost and despairing that they will have the respect and sense of purpose they have always longed for, if they only hate hard enough."

Sexual and romantic entitlement 
Mass murderers, in some cases identifying as incels, have described being motivated by a perception of entitlement to sex or companionship with women, a desire to seek vengeance for the perception of being rejected by women, and a drive to put women "in their place". For example, in the 2014 Isla Vista attack, the perpetrator set out to "punish all females for the crime of depriving me of sex." Incel ideology has been a contributing factor to 90 fatalities and injuries since this attack, as of early 2020. Feminist writer Jessica Valenti argues that such incels should be viewed as misogynist terrorists and warns that they are being radicalized online.

Sexual entitlement, alone, has been a primary motivator for acts of terror. The ICCT have found that anti-feminist conspiracy theories are typically combined with other far-right ideologies in motivating terrorists; however, sexual entitlement may be a motivation that stands by itself.

In contrast, some terrorists see themselves as combating improper sexual desire. For example, the 2021 Atlanta spa shootings appear to have been motivated by Evangelical Christian beliefs about sexual sin. Alex DiBranco considers this motivation related to sexual entitlement because it also blames women for the perpetrator's own sexual desires.

Male supremacism 
In some attacks or threats of terrorism the perpetrator has described desire to reinforce male superiority in a sexual hierarchy by preventing women from being recognized for their work or tolerated in leadership positions. For example, feminist video game critic Anita Sarkeesian received threats of mass shooting and bombing unless a ceremony in which she was to be given an award were canceled. The ICCT argues that the Hanau terrorist attack should be understood as motivated by male supremacism, despite the perpetrator sharing some beliefs of incels.

Proving manhood 
Valenti writes that some misogynist terrorists have been motivated by a desire to live up to a stereotype that "real men" are powerful.

Incel beliefs can include an abhorrence of men who are perceived as sexually successful with women. Male victims of misogynist violence have been targeted because of a desperation to assert superiority over these men.

Causing fear 
As is typical of terrorism, these acts are intended to cause widespread fear. Any woman may reasonably be unsettled about the potential of being targeted, notes philosopher Kate Manne, because often victims of these killings are treated as essentially interchangeable. Women are targeted merely because they fit a certain type rather than because they have any particular relationship to the killer.

Misogyny need not mean hostility to women universally, or even very generally. Instead, misogynist terrorists often express desire to target women of a particular type, as revenge for perceived slights, or because of a perceived connection of the targeted women with feminism. However, the women targeted have no actual connection to a terrorist targeting indiscriminately; instead they are viewed as representatives or stand-ins for the women he wishes to harm.

Responses 
Like other forms of terrorism, misogynist extremist violence is intended to make a political statement. However, political responses to this form of terrorism have been less proactive than the governmental response to Islamic terrorism and other forms of terrorism.

Counter-terrorist response is complicated by cultural attitudes toward misogynist crimes in general. Such crimes tend to be viewed as a "private issue" rather than a proper political subject. Further, because incel attacks sometimes target both men and women indiscriminately, the gender-based motivation of these attacks has been difficult to recognize.

Prosecutions 
Christopher Cleary pled guilty to a charge of attempted threat of terrorism for an attack he planned against the 2019 Women's March rally in Provo, Utah. This was the first terrorism-related sentence given to a male supremacist perpetrator motivated primarily by sexual entitlement.

The 2020 Toronto machete attack, in which the perpetrator was associated with an incel group, is the first known instance of someone charged with terrorism on the basis of a misogynist ideology.

In January 2021, a man in Edinburgh, Scotland was convicted and jailed for breaking terrorism laws by acquiring weapons in preparation for a misogynist attack.

Mitigation 
Writers at the Institute for Research on Male Supremacism note that acts of misogynist mass violence can be placed on a continuum with intimate partner abuse, stalking, and other gender-based harassment and violence. They recommend addressing misogynist terrorism with the same approaches applied to these other problems, such as with domestic abuse perpetrator intervention programs.

Australian researchers have recommended securitisation of incel ideology, as has been done for other ideologies that animate terrorism.

Jessica Valenti recommends that feminism build a helpful alternative culture for young men, as it has successfully for young women, which would give young men an alternative to misogynist online communities when seeking respite from mainstream culture's constraints.

List of incidents 
1989 École Polytechnique massacre
1991 Luby's shooting
2009 Collier Township shooting
2014 Isla Vista killings
2014–2015 Portsmouth knife attacks
2015 Umpqua Community College shooting
2017 Aztec High School shooting
2018 Toronto van attack
2018 systematic shooting of female drivers in Texas
2018 Tallahassee shooting
2020 Hanau shootings
2020 Toronto machete attack
2020 Glendale Westgate Entertainment District shooting
 2021 Atlanta spa shootings
2021 Plymouth shooting
2022 Central Visual and Performing Arts High School shooting

See also 
Domestic violence
Boko Haram
Incel
Manosphere
Taliban
Violence against women

Notes

References

Further reading 

Special-interest terrorism
Political violence
Chauvinism
Violence against women